Microcephala is a genus of Asian flowering plants in the chamomile tribe within the daisy family.

 Species
 Microcephala afghanica Podlech - Afghanistan
 Microcephala deserticola Podlech - Afghanistan
 Microcephala lamellata (Bunge) Pobed. - Irkutsk, Kazakhstan, Uzbekistan, Kyrgyzstan, Tajikistan, Turkmenistan, Xinjiang 
 Microcephala subglobosa (Krasch.) Pobed. - Irkutsk 
 Microcephala turcomanica (C.Winkl.) Pobed. - Uzbekistan, Kyrgyzstan, Tajikistan, Turkmenistan, Iran

References

Anthemideae
Asteraceae genera